The Council of Sages is a U.S.-appointed unelected group of prominent elite Haitians who supported the 2004 coup d'etat that deposed exiled Haitian president Jean Bertrand-Aristide. 

Members of the council were as follow: Lamartine CLERMONT, Ariel HENRY, Anne-Marie ISSA, Mac Donald JEAN, Danièle MAGLOIRE, Christian ROUSSEAU, and Paul Emile SIMON

See also
2004 Haitian coup d'état
Group of 184

References

Politics of Haiti
Political organizations based in Haiti